Ajna Evelin Késely (born 10 September 2001) is a Hungarian competitive swimmer who specializes in freestyle.

Career
In 2014, she competed in all three individual backstroke events at the short course world championships in Doha, Qatar.

At the 2016 European Aquatics Championships in London, she finished 6th in the 200 meter freestyle. She won a gold medal in the 4 × 200 m freestyle relay for swimming in the heats.

At the 2016 European Junior Championships in Hódmezővásárhely, Hungary, she won three individual gold medals, in the 200, 400, and 800 meter freestyle events. She broke two championships records and also won two medals in relay events. At the 2017 European Junior Championships in Netanya, Israel, she won six gold medals, including four in individual freestyle events.

She qualified for the 2016 Summer Olympics in Rio de Janeiro in the 200 and 400 meter freestyle. She finished 25th and 21st, respectively. With the 4*200m freestyle relay she finished 6th in Rio.

She qualified for the 2020 Summer Olympics in Tokyo in the 400, 800, and 1500 metre freestyle. She finished 10th in the 400 metre freestyle heats and 9th in the 1500 metre freestyle heats.

One of Ajna's favorite quotes, by Phineas Taylor Barnum says, “Shoot for the moon! Even if you miss, you will land amongst the stars.” Respectively, as Anja continues to train hard and aim high, she will most certainly reach many more international platforms.

International Swimming League 
In 2019 Késely was member of the 2019 International Swimming League representing Team Iron. She won the 400 freestyle in Budapest and got second in the same event in Lewisville.

In 2020 Késely was member of the US-based ISL team New York Breakers.

See also
List of Hungarian records in swimming

References

External links
 
 
 
 

2001 births
Living people
Hungarian female freestyle swimmers
Olympic swimmers of Hungary
Hungarian female swimmers
Swimmers at the 2016 Summer Olympics
Swimmers at the 2020 Summer Olympics
European Aquatics Championships medalists in swimming
European Championships (multi-sport event) silver medalists
Swimmers from Budapest
Swimmers at the 2018 Summer Youth Olympics
Youth Olympic gold medalists for Hungary